The Arabic nisba al-Tikriti refers to people who were either born in or whose family were from the Iraqi town of Tikrit.  In particular it may refer to:

 Abu Raita al-Takriti, 8th century Christian theologian.
 Ali Hassan Abd al-Majid al-Tikriti, former Ba'athist Iraqi Defense Minister and military commander.
 Barzan Ibrahim al-Tikriti, half-brother of Saddam Hussein and leader of the Iraqi Intelligence Service.
 Hardan al-Tikriti, Iraqi Air Force commander, politician and ambassador.
 Omar al-Tikriti, son of Barzan Ibrahim al-Tikriti wanted in Iraq for committing acts of terror.
 Rafi' Daham Al-Tikriti, director of the Iraqi Intelligence Service, former Iraqi Ambassador to Turkey and former Head of the Iraqi Secret Services.
 Sabawi Ibrahim al-Tikriti, half brother of Saddam Hussein, leader of the Iraqi Intelligence Service and presidential advisor.
 Saddam Hussein Abd al-Majid al-Tikriti, President of Iraq from 1979 to 2003.

Arabic-language surnames
Political families of Iraq
Tikriti